Carugate is a comune (municipality) in the Metropolitan City of Milan in the Italian region Lombardy, located about  northeast of Milan.  
Carugate borders the following municipalities: Agrate Brianza, Caponago, Brugherio, Pessano con Bornago, Bussero, Cernusco sul Naviglio.

References

External links
 Official website

Cities and towns in Lombardy